Thomas Frederick Von Ruden (August 22, 1944 – May 17, 2018) was a middle distance runner from the United States. He is best known for winning the gold medal in the men's 1500 metres at the 1967 Pan American Games in Winnipeg, Manitoba, Canada. Von Ruden set his personal best (3:38.5) in the same event on 26 July 1971 at a meet in Århus. He also competed in the men's 1500 metres at the 1968 Summer Olympics.

1985 Von Ruden won the 1500 m at the Masters West Region Championship.

References

External links
 trackfield.brinkster

1944 births
2018 deaths
People from Coeur d'Alene, Idaho
Track and field athletes from Idaho
Track and field athletes from Oklahoma
American male middle-distance runners
Athletes (track and field) at the 1967 Pan American Games
Athletes (track and field) at the 1968 Summer Olympics
Pan American Games gold medalists for the United States
Pan American Games medalists in athletics (track and field)
Olympic track and field athletes of the United States
Medalists at the 1967 Pan American Games
American masters athletes